Cecilia Curbelo (Montevideo, 23 January 1975), also known as Ceci, is an Uruguayan journalist, columnist, writer and publishing.

Books 

 2017, Aunque ella esté 
 2018, A la manera de Agustina 
 2019, Lucas (e Inés) sin etiquetas  
 2019, Maju, ¡pará de hablar! 
 2020, Lo que Natalia no sabe 
 2021, Maju, ¡no sos el ombligo del mundo!
 2021, Matías y Emma en una jaula de oro.
2022, Amiga tóxica.

Awards 
2011, Premio Cervantes.
2012, Premio Quijote.
2012, Golden Book Award by Cámara Uruguaya del Libro (Uruguayan Book Chamber), for her book La decisión de Camila, to be bestseller of the year.
2012, Premio Bartolomé Hidalgo, revelación.
2014, Golden Book Award by Cámra Uruguaya del Libro (Uruguayan Book Chamber), for her book La otra vida de Belén, to be bestseller of the year.

References

External links 

1975 births
Living people
Catholic University of Uruguay alumni
Writers from Montevideo
Uruguayan journalists
Uruguayan columnists
21st-century Uruguayan women writers
Uruguayan women journalists
Uruguayan women columnists